Calum Scott (born 12 October 1988) is an English singer and songwriter. In April 2015, he rose to prominence after competing on the ITV talent contest Britain's Got Talent, where he performed his version of Robyn's hit "Dancing on My Own". After coming sixth in the contest, he released his version as a single the following year, which peaked at number two on the UK Singles Chart and became Britain's best-selling single of summer 2016.

Scott later signed with Capitol and in 2017, released the single "You Are the Reason", which was included on his 2018 debut album Only Human, which reached number 4 on the UK Albums Chart. Later in 2018, he collaborated with Leona Lewis to release a duet version of the single "You Are the Reason".

Early life
Scott was born in Beverley, East Riding of Yorkshire, to parents Debbie Burton and Kevin Scott, and grew up around the Yorkshire area, mainly North Ferriby and Kingston upon Hull. His parents split up when he was two years old, and his father moved to Canada. He has a younger sister, Jade, who is also a singer. Scott played the drums, and his sister later encouraged him to sing. Prior to his fame, he worked in human resources.

Career

2013–2015: Career beginning and Britain's Got Talent
On 15 August 2013, Scott won the talent competition Mail's Star Search, organised by Hull Daily Mail. He then joined a Maroon 5 tribute band, Maroon 4, and toured around the United Kingdom. In 2014 he formed the electronic duo, The Experiment with John McIntyre. The debut single, "Girl (You're Beautiful)", was released on 14 June. The duo performed the song on Good Morning Britain and BBC Look North, but after, broke up.

On 11 April 2015, Scott's audition for the ninth series of Britain's Got Talent was broadcast on ITV. Just before his audition, his sister Jade also auditioned but was stopped early on both of her songs by Simon Cowell. Jade received four "No" votes from David Walliams, Alesha Dixon, Amanda Holden and Simon Cowell.

Despite obvious nerves at seeing his sister get rejected, Calum performed a cover of Robyn's "Dancing on My Own", which he had heard Kings of Leon performing on BBC Radio 1's Live Lounge in 2013. Following a standing ovation from the judging panel, Cowell pressed the Golden Buzzer giving Scott an automatic place in the live shows. Explaining his decision to send Scott straight to the semi-finals, Cowell said:
 After this audition, Scott received support from stars such as Little Mix and Ashton Kutcher.

Following his appearance on the show's first episode, his Twitter followers jumped from 400 to over 25,000. The video of his audition has been viewed over 373 million times on YouTube. In the semi-final on 29 May, Scott performed "We Don't Have to Take Our Clothes Off" by Jermaine Stewart. Walliams commented "You really sound like a recording artist", whilst Alesha Dixon suggested that he could have "success around the world". He won the semi-final with 25.6% of the vote, sending him straight through to the final. In the final on 31 May, Scott performed "Diamonds" by Rihanna and finished sixth out of 12 contestants with 8.2% of the vote. After Britain's Got Talent, Scott embarked on a series of shows around the United Kingdom, including Viking FM Future Star Awards, Flamingo Land Resort Fair, Westwood Cross Shopping Centre's tenth anniversary, Gibraltar Summer Nights, Hull Daily Mail's Star and Dartford Festival.

2016–2018: Only Human

Scott released his cover of "Dancing on My Own" independently on 15 April 2016. It became a sleeper hit, first hitting number 40 in the charts in May and climbing into the top 40 despite little radio airplay apart from on West Hull FM. It was then added to Radio 2's "C List" and reached number two on the UK Singles Chart on 5 August. In August 2016, it was certified platinum in the UK, having sold over 600,000 copies. Scott announced on Twitter on 24 May that he had inked a record deal with Capitol Records, where he was signed by A&R Executive Alex Wilhelm. Scott performed the song at television shows BBC Look North, Lorraine, Weekend, Late Night with Seth Meyers and Brazilian show Encontro com Fátima Bernardes. He also promoted the song on several radio stations, including BBC Radio Humberside, Viking FM, Radio Gibraltar, BFBS Radio and Gibraltar Broadcasting Corporation. On 16 September, he released the promotional single "Transformar" with Brazilian recording artist Ivete Sangalo as the official song of the 2016 Summer Paralympics in Rio de Janeiro; they performed the song at the closing ceremony on 18 September. It was revealed in September 2016 that "Dancing on My Own" was the most downloaded song of the summer in the UK. In autumn 2022, "Dancing On My Own" had a sudden resurgence in popularity due to the Philadelphia Phillies players and fans embracing the song during the team's run to the 2022 World Series.

In 2017, he toured the US and released the single "You Are the Reason". Also in 2017, he began working on his debut album, Only Human, which was released on 9 March 2018. A new version of "You Are the Reason" was released ahead of the album in early 2018 as a collaboration with Leona Lewis, and was performed by the two on The One Show in February 2018. In May, Scott released "What I Miss Most" as the fourth single from Only Human.

In October 2018, Scott released a new single titled "No Matter What". Upon release, Scott said:

2019–present: Bridges
In September 2020, Scott partnered with American watch company Bulova on the development of a music documentary series titled Minutes with Calum, which explores the creative process behind his upcoming second album through the lens of Bulova.

In March 2021, Scott digitally released his first EP, titled Only Acoustic, which featured acoustic renditions of songs from his debut album. The following month, he released two more EPs; Only Collabs and Only Love.

On 11 June 2021, Scott released the single "Biblical", the first song from his upcoming second album. He released the second song titled "Rise" on 1 October 2021, and the third song titled "If You Ever Change Your Mind" on 4 February 2022. On 29 April 2022, Scott announced that his second album, Bridges, would be released on 17 June 2022. On the same day, he released the fourth song, "Heaven", from the album.

In July 2021, Scott collaborated with Belgian artist Lost Frequencies singing on a song titled "Where Are You Now", which was released on 30 July 2021. The song became a big hit over the next several months, charting on many streaming platforms in many countries. In early February 2022, the song reached the top 10 of the UK Singles Chart, becoming Scott's second song to reach the UK top 10.

In November 2021, Scott collaborated with Brazilian recording artist Bryan Behr, singing on the song "Da Primeira Vez (From the First Time)". Scott sang in both English and Portuguese. Also in November 2021, he collaborated with British singer Jasmine Thompson on a song titled "Love Is Just a Word".

Personal life
Scott is openly gay. He has talked about having struggled with his sexuality when growing up, but since becoming an adult, he is confident about it.

Activism
Scott is a proponent of mental health awareness and suicide prevention. In 2020, he performed live in support of Mind for Mental Health Awareness, donating all proceeds to Mind.

Discography

Studio albums

Extended plays

Singles

As lead artist

As featured artist

Promotional singles

Songwriting credits

Notes

Videography

As lead artist

As collaborative artist

As featured artist

Tours

Headlining
 North American Tour (2016–17)
 Only Human Tour (2018)
 Bridges World Tour (2022)

Supporting act
 Jamie Lawson UK Tour (2016) 
 PTX Summer Tour 2018 (2018) 
 2Sides World Tour (2018) 
 Greatest Hits Tour (2022)

Awards and nominations

References

External links

 
 
 

1988 births
Living people
Britain's Got Talent contestants
Capitol Records artists
English male singer-songwriters
English pop singers
English gay musicians
English LGBT singers
English LGBT songwriters
Musicians from Kingston upon Hull
Gay singers
Gay songwriters
21st-century English male singers
20th-century LGBT people
21st-century LGBT people
People from Beverley